List of Star Trek: The Original Series episodes
 List of Star Trek: The Animated Series episodes
 List of Star Trek: The Next Generation episodes
 List of Star Trek: Deep Space Nine episodes
 List of Star Trek: Voyager episodes
 List of Star Trek: Enterprise episodes
 List of Star Trek: Discovery episodes
 List of Star Trek: Short Treks episodes
 List of Star Trek: Picard episodes
 List of Star Trek: Lower Decks episodes
 List of Star Trek: Prodigy episodes
 List of Star Trek: Strange New Worlds episodes

See also
 List of Star Trek television series
 List of Star Trek films
 List of Star Trek games